Mission Pass is a historic mountain pass in the Bridge River-Lillooet Country of the Interior of British Columbia, Canada, around  west of Lillooet, towards the west end of Seton Lake.

References

Mountain passes of British Columbia
Bridge River Country